Charles Lennox may refer to:

Charles Lennox, 1st Duke of Richmond and 1st Duke of Lennox (1672-1723)
Charles Lennox, 2nd Duke of Richmond and 2nd Duke of Lennox (1701-1750)
Charles Lennox, 3rd Duke of Richmond and 3rd Duke of Lennox (1734-1806)
Charles Lennox, 4th Duke of Richmond and 4th Duke of Lennox (1764-1819)
Charles Lenox, the amateur detective featured in Victorian era mystery novels by Charles Finch

See also
Charles Gordon-Lennox (disambiguation)